Erik Philip Paulsen (born May 14, 1965) is an American businessman and politician who represented  in the United States House of Representatives from 2009 to 2019. A member of the Republican Party, he served in the Minnesota House of Representatives from 1995 to 2009 and as majority leader from 2003 to 2007.

In 1994 Paulsen was elected to the Minnesota House of Representatives from District 42B, which covered part of suburban Eden Prairie, Minnesota. He was reelected six times and, in addition, he was elected by his fellow house Republicans to serve as majority leader from 2003 until 2007. He won the 2008 election to the U.S. House of Representatives in Minnesota’s 3rd congressional district, which covers the western suburbs of the Twin Cities, and succeeded retiring Republican incumbent Jim Ramstad. Paulsen represented the district in Congress for five terms. He easily won reelection four times, but was defeated in his 2018 reelection bid by Democrat Dean Phillips. From 2018 until 2019, he served as chair of the Joint Economic Committee.

Early life, education, and career 
Born in Bakersfield, California, Paulsen graduated from Chaska High School in Minnesota in 1983. He attended St. Olaf College, and received a Bachelor of Arts in mathematics in 1987. After college, Paulsen worked as an intern for Republican Senator Rudy Boschwitz from 1989 until Boschwitz was defeated by Democratic challenger Paul Wellstone in 1990. Paulsen then took a staff position with Republican Representative Jim Ramstad in Washington, D.C. He worked on Ramstad's local congressional campaign in 1992 before seeking election to the Minnesota House of Representatives in 1994. He succeeded Sidney Pauly.

From 2007 to 2009 Paulsen worked as a part-time business analyst for Target Corporation while a member of the Minnesota House of Representatives.

Minnesota House of Representatives 
Paulsen was elected as member of the Republican Party. Before entering politics he was a businessman. He served on the Commerce and Labor, Rules and Legislative Administration, Taxes, and Ways and Means committees.

U.S. House of Representatives

Elections
2008

2010

2012

2014

2016

2018

Committee assignments

 The Bicameral Joint Economic Committee
 The House Committee on Ways and Means
 Subcommittee on Health
 Subcommittee on Trade

Town halls
In 2017 a group of constituents sought signatures on a petition asking Paulsen to hold public town hall meetings. His campaign primarily held townhalls over the phone with campaign aides screening questions, in addition to business tours and private meetings. Paulsen was invited to attend a "With or Without Him" town hall meeting but declined.

On May 30, 2018, Paulsen held three in-person town hall meetings in the 3rd district. During the events he distanced himself from Donald Trump and congressional leaders.

Political positions
Paulsen was a member of the Republican Main Street Partnership, the Republican Study Committee, the Congressional Arts Caucus, the United States Congressional International Conservation Caucus and the Climate Solutions Caucus.

Paulsen opposed the Lilly Ledbetter Fair Pay Act of 2009. He voted against the James Zadroga 9/11 Health and Compensation Act. Paulsen introduced the Text a Tip Act to the House in 2010. The bill would have allowed users to send tips about crimes to a third party, removing all identifying information about the source before the police received the message. The bill died in committee and was not adopted.

In 2010 Paulsen cosponsored a draft of the Small Business Assistance and Relief Act intended to provide increased lending and aid for small businesses and ease their financial burden.

Paulsen supported the special investigation into Russian interference in the 2016 election and Trump's dismissal of James Comey. In February 2017 Paulsen voted against requesting Trump's tax returns from the Treasury Department.

FiveThirtyEight found that Paulsen voted with Trump 98% of the time, and was the third-most partisan Republican in the House when compared to his district's voting patterns.

Economy
Paulsen helped to author the Republican tax reform of 2017, the Tax Cuts and Jobs Act.

Paulsen supported continuing the Bush-era tax cuts and global free trade agreements. He voted for the fiscal 2012 federal budget plan that provided for substantial overhaul of Medicare, including replacement of the traditional program with a premium support payment for private health insurance coverage for Americans under age 55.

Paulsen voted against the American Recovery and Reinvestment Act and Dodd-Frank.

Health care
In 2009 Paulsen expressed opposition to a public health insurance option and instead supported a Republican alternative plan. At an April 7, 2010, Republican rally in Minneapolis, Paulsen described the Affordable Care Act as a "government takeover of health care," a claim that Minnesota Public Radio said "isn't correct."

Paulsen voted to repeal the Affordable Care Act. In January 2017 he voted for the budget reconciliation provision to begin the process of ACA repeal.

On May 4, 2017, Paulsen voted to repeal the Patient Protection and Affordable Care Act (Obamacare) and for the American Health Care Act.

In February 2018 Paulsen sponsored legislation to repeal caps on Medicare outpatient services such as physical therapy.

Paulsen introduced legislation to combat opioid abuse by educating seniors about non-opioid alternative pain treatments and ways to safely dispose of addictive painkillers.

Immigration
Paulsen was a longtime proponent of immigration reform and supported granting temporary legal status to those who were brought to the U.S. illegally as children, saying he supported "ensuring that young people who came to the United States through no fault of their own and have done nothing wrong are able to be valuable contributors to our country."

In May 2018 Paulsen joined House Democrats in signing a "discharge petition" to force the House to vote on a series of immigration bills, including one that would provide permanent legal status to those who came to the country illegally as children.

Paulsen did not support building a wall along the U.S. border with Mexico, citing its projected multi-billion-dollar cost.

Environment
Paulsen had a lifetime rating of 16% from the League of Conservation Voters. He called for an end to Minnesota's ban on building nuclear power plants, saying that "trying to meet our energy needs without using nuclear energy is a little bit like trying to row a boat with one oar." Along with 95% of Republicans and 17% of Democrats, he voted against the American Clean Energy and Security Act, which would have imposed a cap-and-trade system.

Paulsen voted against allowing copper-sulfide mining in the Boundary Waters Canoe Area.

LGBT rights
In 2010 Paulsen voted against a bill repealing the U.S. military's "don't ask, don't tell" policy. In 2017 he voted for an amendment that would have defunded transition-related healthcare for transgender soldiers in the military.

Guns
From 2007 through 2018 Paulsen received $21,150 in campaign contributions from the National Rifle Association (NRA), which gave him an "A" rating. As of June 2016 he had voted 13 times against bringing gun safety bills to the House floor.

In February 2018 Paulsen said he would support a ban on bump stocks, strengthened background checks, a lifting of the ban on federal research for gun violence, and gun violence restraining orders.

In May 2018 Paulsen co-sponsored the Jake Laird Act, which provides grants to encourage states to adopt gun violence restraining order laws. Gun violence restraining orders enable local law enforcement to seize and retain firearms from people who are determined to be an imminent danger to themselves or others.

In December 2017 Paulsen voted for the Concealed Carry Reciprocity Act of 2017, which allows people with a concealed carry permit in one state to legally travel with hidden guns to any other state.

Legislation
On February 13, 2013, Paulsen introduced the National Park Service 100th Anniversary Commemorative Coin Act (H.R. 627; 113th Congress), a bill that would direct the Secretary of the Treasury to mint and issue gold, silver, and half-dollar clad coins in commemoration of the 100th anniversary of the establishment of the National Park Service (NPS). The coins would all have a surcharge attached, the money from which would be given to the National Park Foundation.

Paulsen strongly supported a bill that would make it easier for nonbank financial institutions such as money service businesses to provide remittance payments internationally. He argued that the bill would make it easier for American immigrants "supporting their extended families overseas" to help their relatives, while still "providing the necessary safeguards to ensure their money reaches its intended destination."

On November 21, 2013, Paulsen introduced the Stop Exploitation Through Trafficking Act of 2013 (H.R. 3610; 113th Congress), a bill that would require each state, within three years, to have in effect legislation that: (1) treats a minor who has engaged or attempted to engage in a commercial sex act as a victim of a severe form of trafficking in persons, (2) discourages the charging or prosecution of such an individual for a prostitution or sex trafficking offense, and (3) encourages the diversion of such individual to child protection services. The bill was scheduled to be voted on in the House on May 20, 2014 under a suspension of the rules.

With Democratic U.S. Senator Amy Klobuchar, Paulsen led an effort to repeal an excise tax on medical devices imposed by the Patient Protection and Affordable Care Act. The bill passed the House one vote shy of a veto-proof majority. A two-year suspension of the tax was included in a 2015 year-end funding bill.

Also in 2015 Paulsen authored a bill to provide tax incentives to encourage food donations and wrote a provision of the National Defense Authorization Act that requires the Department of Defense to return all military working dogs to the United States after completing their service. The American Humane Association strongly advocated passage of this provision.

Personal life
During college at St. Olaf, Paulsen met his wife Kelly. As of 2014, the Paulsens have four daughters and lived in Eden Prairie. Paulsen serves as a board member of the Eden Prairie A Brighter Day Foundation, Habitat for Global Learning, Habitat for Technology and the Southdale YMCA. He is a member of the American Council of Young Political Leaders and the Eden Prairie Chamber of Commerce, and volunteers for Learning Exchange.

Paulsen has participated in the inaugural two-year class of the Aspen Rodel Fellowship in Public Leadership, the German Marshall Memorial Fellowship, the Young Leaders Forum of the National Committee on U.S.-China Relations, and the American Council of Young Political Leaders. He has been granted an Aspen Institute Rodel Fellowship in Public Leadership, and a Marshall Memorial Fellowship from the German Marshall Fund of the United States.

See also
 List of United States representatives from Minnesota
 United States congressional delegations from Minnesota

References

External links
 
 
 

|-

|-

|-

|-

|-

1965 births
21st-century American politicians
American Lutherans
American people of Norwegian descent
Living people
Republican Party members of the Minnesota House of Representatives
People from Eden Prairie, Minnesota
Politicians from Bakersfield, California
Republican Party members of the United States House of Representatives from Minnesota
St. Olaf College alumni
United States congressional aides